William B. Kristan, Jr. is an American biologist, currently a Distinguished Professor Emeritus at the University of California, San Diego.

He was awarded a Ph.D. by the University of Pennsylvania before becoming a postdoctoral fellow at Stanford University. He was awarded a 1981 Guggenheim Fellowship and was a Fellow of the University of Bielefeld, Germany.

His interests are in the behaviour of neuronal networks and their creation during embryogenesis.
using a variety of advanced techniques to examine the circuits in the relatively controllable nervous system of the medicinal leech.

References

University of California, San Diego faculty
21st-century American biologists
Living people
Year of birth missing (living people)